Amylostereum areolatum is a species of crust fungus. Originally called Thelephora areolata in 1828, it was given its current name by French mycologist Jacques Boidin in 1958.

References

External links

Russulales
Fungi of Europe
Fungi described in 1828